Egor Yuryevich Bazin (born 13 September 1995) is a Russian ice dancer. With his former partner, Sofia Evdokimova, he is the 2017 Winter Universiade silver medalist, the 2018 Ice Star champion, and the 2019 Russian national bronze medalist.

He currently skates with Elizaveta Khudaiberdieva.

Career

Early career 
Bazin teamed up with Sofia Evdokimova in 2007. The duo debuted on the ISU Junior Grand Prix (JGP) series in the 2011–12 season, finishing seventh in Austria. In the 2013–14 season, they won their first JGP medal – bronze in Mexico.

2014–2015 season 
Evdokimova/Bazin started their season by competing in the 2014 JGP series. They placed fourth in both events, first at the JGP Czech Republic and then at the JGP Germany.

In 2014–15 season, Evdokimova/Bazin stepped onto the national podium for the first time, beating Loboda/Drozd by 0.19 points for the bronze medal at the Russian Junior Championships. Based on this result, they were chosen to compete as Russia's third ice dancing team at the 2015 World Junior Championships in Tallinn, Estonia. Finishing tenth, Evdokimova/Bazin were the second best Russian duet after Yanovskaya/Mozgov (gold), with Popova/Vlasenko placing eleventh.

2015–2016 season 
In the 2015–16 season, Evdokimova/Bazin won their second JGP medal – bronze in Latvia. Two weeks later, they placed fifth in JGP Austria. In October 2015, they won their first international gold medal at the 2015 Ice Star. In January 2016 they finished fourth at the 2016 Russian Junior Championships.

2016–2017 season: First Winter Universiade silver medal 
In November 2016, Evdokimova/Bazin made their Grand Prix debut at the 2016 Rostelecom Cup, where they placed ninth. A month later, they skated their first Challenger event at the 2016 CS Golden Spin of Zagreb, where they also placed ninth. In December, they placed sixth at the 2017 Russian Championships. In February 2017, they competed at the 2017 Winter Universiade, where they won the silver medal behind Nazorova/Nikitin.

2017–2018 season 
In November 2017, Evdokimova/Bazin skated at the 2017 CS Tallinn Trophy, where they placed fourth. In Tallinn, they were close to claiming their first Challenger series medal because they were less than 0.5 points behind the bronze medalists, Pogrebinsky/Benoit. A month later, Evdokimova/Bazin placed fifth at the 2018 Russian Championships.

2018–2019 season 
Evdokimova/Bazin started their season at the 2018 CS Finlandia Trophy, where they finished seventh with a personal best score of 159.67 points. They won their first international senior gold medal two weeks later at the 2018 Ice Star. In mid-November, they competed at the 2018 Rostelecom Cup, where they finished fourth after placing sixth in the rhythm dance and fourth in the free dance. At this competition, they also scored their personal best score 164.66 points. In late November, they placed fourth at the 2018 CS Tallinn Trophy with a personal best score of 168.31 points.

At the 2019 Russian Championships, Evdokimova/Bazin placed fourth in the rhythm dance, around 3 points behind the third-place finishers Zahorski/Guerreiro and only half a point ahead of Shpilevaya/Smirnov in fifth.  In the free dance, a disastrous skate by Zahorski/Guerreiro allowed them to take the bronze medal.  Bazin said this had been their goal from the beginning of the season.  They competed at their first European Championships, placing ninth.

2019–2020 season: End of partnership with Evdokimova 
Evodkimova/Bazin placed seventh at the 2019 CS Ondrej Nepela Memorial to begin the season.  Competing on the Grand Prix, they were ninth at the 2019 Skate Canada International and then sixth at the 2019 Cup of China.  At the 2020 Russian Championships, they placed seventh.

In March, it was announced that the two had split.

In May, Bazin was named to the Russian senior national team for the 2020–21 season with new partner and 2019 Junior Worlds silver medalist, Elizaveta Khudaiberdieva.

2020–2021 season: Debut of Khudaiberdieva/Bazin 
Khudaiberdieva/Bazin made their debut at the senior Russian test skates, where Bazin fell on a twizzle in the free dance. They made their competitive debut at the first stage of the domestic Russian Cup series, the qualifying competition series to the 2021 Russian Figure Skating Championships, in Syzran in September. They placed first in the rhythm dance and second in the free dance to narrowly win the gold medal ahead of Morozov/Bagin. At their next event, the third stage held in Sochi, the team placed second in both the rhythm dance and the free dance to take second overall behind reigning national bronze medalists Zahorski/Guerreiro.

In November, Khudaiberdieva/Bazin made their international debut at the 2020 Rostelecom Cup, where they placed fifth in the rhythm dance, just narrowly behind Morozov/Bagin. In the free dance, Khudaiberdieva/Bazin managed to overtake Morozov/Bagin by a little less than three points to place fourth in the free dance and fourth overall.

Competing at their first senior Russian Championships together (and Khudaiberdieva's first), they placed fourth in the rhythm dance despite a twizzle wobble from Bazin that earned him only a level 2 on that element.  In the free dance, Khudaiberdieva stumbled on her twizzle sequence, placing them sixth in that segment and fifth overall.

Following the national championships, Khudaiberdieva/Bazin participated in the 2021 Channel One Trophy, a televised team competition held in lieu of the cancelled European Championships. They were selected for the Red Machine team captained by Alina Zagitova.  They placed fifth in both their segments of the competition, while their team finished in first overall.

2021–2022 season 
Khudaiberdieva/Bazin began the season at the 2021 CS Denis Ten Memorial Challenge, where they won the bronze medal and then took gold at the Volvo Open Cup. In their lone Grand Prix assignment, they were eighth at the 2021 Rostelecom Cup.

At the 2022 Russian Championships, Khudaiberdieva/Bazin placed sixth in the rhythm dance. In the free dance, following the withdrawal of top team Sinitsina/Katsalapov due to injury, Khudaiberdieva/Bazin moved up to the bronze medal with a third place in that segment. Bazin said afterward, "not only one couple tried to qualify for the Olympics, everyone tried. We want to at least have a chance to fight a little bit." This was widely interpreted as querying the validity of the scores for controversial silver medalists Davis/Smolkin.

Programs

With Khudaibedieva

With Evdokimova

Competitive highlights 
GP: Grand Prix; CS: Challenger Series; JGP: Junior Grand Prix

With Khudaiberdieva

With Evdokimova

Detailed results 
Small medals for short and free programs awarded only at ISU Championships.

With Khudaiberdieva

With Evdokimova

References

External links 
 
 

1995 births
Russian male ice dancers
Living people
Sportspeople from Tolyatti
Universiade medalists in figure skating
Universiade silver medalists for Russia
Competitors at the 2017 Winter Universiade
Competitors at the 2019 Winter Universiade